Sky Trooper is a 1942 animated cartoon by Walt Disney Studios starring Donald Duck during the World War II years. It was directed by Jack King based on a script by Carl Barks.

Plot
Donald Duck is in trouble and is peeling potatoes. He wants desperately to fly, so he cuts a potato to look like an airplane. He threw it, and it caught Sergeant Black Pete's cap and brought it back to Donald, like a boomerang. Donald cuts it, thinking that it is a potato. When the sergeant comes in, he finds his cap cut in airplane shapes and found out about Donald's ambition to fly. Donald is forced to peel tons more potatoes, but is promised the opportunity to fly after he cuts them all. After cutting all the potatoes, Donald reports to the Flight Sergeant's office and manages to fail all the equilibrium-finding exercises that the Sergeant comes up with, and when the Sergeant told him to "pin the tail on that airplane", Donald obliges after walking on the outside ledge of the building (on the third floor), knocking over a huge vase. Donald made his way back in, sticking the pin on the startled Sergeant, who falls all three stories.

The Sergeant gives Donald the chance to fly, albeit as a parachute troop. Donald, duped, went along for the ride, and is surprised to find himself several thousand feet above the ground. Donald and the Sergeant fight, until both tumble out of the plane, but not before the Sergeant grabs a bomb to try to stay on, and it came away with them. On the way down, the two try to give the bomb to each other, until their fight is ended by their crashing into the General's Headquarters. The clip ends with the Sergeant and Donald, both with a cast on their leg and arm, respectively, and peeling potatoes. When Donald tells Pete "Boy, was that, sir, some surprise", Pete tells Donald "Ah, shut up!" and puts a potato on Donald's bill silencing Donald, much to Donald's chagrin as he mutters to himself as the cartoon closes.

Voice cast
 Donald Duck: Clarence Nash
 Pete: Billy Bletcher

Home media
The short was released on May 18, 2004, on Walt Disney Treasures: Walt Disney on the Front Lines and on December 6, 2005, on Walt Disney Treasures: The Chronological Donald, Volume Two: 1942-1946.

References

External links 
 

1942 films
1942 animated films
1942 short films
1940s Disney animated short films
Donald Duck short films
World War II aviation films
Films directed by Jack King
Films produced by Walt Disney
World War II films made in wartime
Films scored by Frank Churchill
Films with screenplays by Carl Barks